Ella H. Brockway Avann (Hoag; after first marriage, Brockway; after second marriage, Avann; May 20, 1853 – October 22, 1899) was a 19th-century American educator and writer. After graduating from Albion College of Michigan, she subsequently became preceptress of that institution. She filled the chair of English literature and also lectured on the history of music. For 10 years, she was president of the Woman's Foreign Missionary society. Avann made frequent contributions to the religious press. She held official positions in various literary, social and benevolent societies.

Early life and education
Ella Eleura Hoag was born in Newaygo, Michigan, May 20, 1853. Her father, the Rev. G. W. Hoag, born in Charlotte, Vermont, was of Quaker parentage and a pioneer in the Methodist Episcopal Church in Michigan, having gone to that State in boyhood. Her mother, Elizabeth Bruce Hoag, from Rochester, New York, was gifted with pen and voice, and was a high official in the Woman's Foreign Missionary Society of her church.

At the age of 12, Avann went to Albion College, Albion, Michigan, and was graduated in 1871.

Career
In 1873, she married L. Hamline Brockway, of Albion, where they lived for 15 years, when his election as county clerk caused their removal to Marshall, Michigan. In 1885, Avann, then Mrs. Brockway, thinking "some good should come as the hours go by", couseling with Mrs. A. G. Dickey, organized "the Monday club" in Marshall and was elected its first president.

After the husband's death in August, 1887, Mrs. Brockway with her son, Bruce, aged 12, and daughter, Ruth, aged six, returned to Albion. In January, 1889, she became preceptress of Albion College, displaying great executive ability. She had great influence over the young women of the college and exercised that power without apparent effort. She led the department of English literature, and also lectured on the history of music. For ten years, she was president of the Woman's Foreign Missionary Society of Albion district.

In June, 1891, she resigned her position in Albion College and on August 11, she married the Rev. Joseph M. Avann, of Findlay, Ohio. She was a pleasing speaker, and occasionally she gave a literary address or spoke in behalf of some benevolent cause away from home. She made frequent contributions to the religious press, and was connected with various literary, social and benevolent societies, holding official positions.

Personal life 
She had one son, Porter Bruce Brockway (1875-1958).

Taken with convulsions, Avann died suddenly at her home in Toledo, Ohio on October 22, 1899, after an illness of 30 hours. She was buried at Riverside Cemetery, in Albion.

References

Attribution

External links
 

1853 births
1899 deaths
19th-century American writers
19th-century American women writers
Educators from Michigan
Writers from Michigan
People from Newaygo, Michigan
American religious writers
Women religious writers
Albion College alumni
Albion College faculty
American women non-fiction writers
American women academics
Wikipedia articles incorporating text from A Woman of the Century